Joonas Granberg (born 30 December 1986) is a Finnish professional golfer.

Granberg played on the Challenge Tour in 2008 and 2009. He played on the Asian Tour in 2011 and won the Worldwide Holdings Selangor Masters.

Professional wins (10)

Asian Tour wins (1)

Nordic Golf League wins (2)

Finnish Tour wins (7)

Team appearances
Amateur
European Boys' Team Championship (representing Finland): 2004
European Amateur Team Championship (representing Finland): 2005
European Youths' Team Championship  (representing Finland): 2006

References

External links

Finnish male golfers
European Tour golfers
Asian Tour golfers
Sportspeople from Helsinki
1986 births
Living people
21st-century Finnish people